Watch Over Me is an American television series that debuted on December 6, 2006 on MyNetworkTV. Twentieth Television produced 66 episodes to air weekdays. The limited-run serial is an adaptation of Argentine series Resistiré.

Dayanara Torres, a former Miss Universe, played a woman torn between her bioterrorist fiancé (Marc Menard) and her bodyguard, played by Todd Cahoon. Catherine Oxenberg and Casper Van Dien also appeared as villains.

Telefe, which produced the original version, syndicates a 64-episode run of the series in Europe, the Middle East, and Asia. It promotes the show as mixing a classic Latin genre with Hollywood aesthetics. From July 2009, it was aired in Slovakia on TV Markíza taking the slot of Latin American telenovelas, but the show was not very successful.

It is currently available for streaming on TubiTV.

Production notes
Watch Over Me was first intended to run as A Dangerous Love under the Secret Obsessions umbrella title.  A Secret Obsessions logo appeared in the show's opening credits—and the MyNetworkTV Web site said that the serial was "part of the Secret Obsessions series."
MyNetworkTV had a special promotional deal with Wal-Mart, which provided wardrobe for the cast from the Metro 7 women's line. Dayanara Torres had previously modeled for the brand.
The theme song was performed by The Transcenders.
The house used as Michael Krieger's compound is located in Rancho Santa Fe, California. Most scenes were filmed at Stu Segall Productions in San Diego.
Recap shows originally aired on Saturdays, but were replaced by movies on February 3, 2007.
Mexico's Televisa commissioned its own version of this story in 2006, titled Amar sin limites ("Love Without Limits").  Univision is expected to air this 135-episode serial in the USA this fall.  The Jack and Julia characters are named Diego Moran and Azul Toscano, while the villan is named Mauricio Duarte.
Clive Robertson turned down a role in this series, calling the part "a waste of time. He later accepted the male lead on Wicked Wicked Games.
Alex Thomas, a main character on Desire, appears in this series.  Actor Zack Silva, shown using footage from the previous MyNetworkTV telenovela, was uncredited.
Catherine Oxenberg and Casper Van Dien were married in real life and have two children.

Cast

See also
 MyNetworkTV telenovelas
 Resistiré
 Amar Sin Limites

References

External links
 
 Three New Primetime Drama Strips for MyNetworkTV
 Wal-Mart Tarts up for TV, New York Post, September 15, 2006.

2000s American LGBT-related drama television series
2006 telenovelas
2007 telenovelas
2006 American television series debuts
2007 American television series endings
American telenovelas
American television series based on telenovelas
American television soap operas
MyNetworkTV original programming
Television series by 20th Century Fox Television
Television shows set in Los Angeles
English-language television shows
American television series based on Argentine television series